Elina Stary (born 19 December 2006) is an Austrian visually impaired para alpine skier.

Career
Stary made her debut at the 2021 World Para Snow Sports Championships held in Lillehammer, Norway where she won the silver medal in the slalom event and the bronze medal in the giant slalom and parallel events. She competed at the 2022 Winter Paralympics held in Beijing, China, having been the youngest competitor in the games.

References 

2006 births
Living people
Austrian female alpine skiers
Alpine skiers at the 2022 Winter Paralympics
Visually impaired category Paralympic competitors
Austrian blind people
21st-century Austrian women